Robert W. Monster (born 1966 or 1967) is a Dutch-American technology executive and the founder and chief executive officer of Epik, a domain registrar and web host known for providing services to websites that host far-right, neo-Nazi, and extremist content.

He has received media attention in relation to Epik, particularly surrounding his 2018 statements about Epik customer Gab, a social network known for its far-right userbase. He has also received attention for controversial statements, including some in which he has promoted various conspiracy theories.

Life and education 
He holds Dutch and American citizenship. He earned his bachelor's degree and MBA at Cornell University. In 2007, Monster became a Christian. He is married to Jill Monster, a naturopath. They have five children, and live in Sammamish, Washington.

Career

Marketing (1991–2007)
Monster began working for Procter & Gamble in 1991, and spent years working in Japan and Germany in this role. In his last year, he was the global product development manager for Pampers, a brand of baby diapers. After eight years at the company, he left in 1999 to move to Seattle, Washington and found Global Market Insite (GMI), an online market research company. He served as the CEO for seven years, until he was ousted by the board in 2007.

Technology (2009–present)

Epik 

Monster founded Epik, a domain registrar and web hosting company, in 2009 in Sammamish, Washington.  he continues to serve as the CEO of the company.

Monster has been an outspoken defender of Epik's choice to host far-right, neo-Nazi, and other extremist content that other web hosts have refused, saying that the company is committed to protecting "lawful free speech". He learned about Gab, a far-right social network, in 2018 when the company received media attention after it was discovered that the perpetrator of the Pittsburgh synagogue shooting had used the service to post extremist content. After it was dropped by its registrar, GoDaddy, he met with Gab CEO Andrew Torba and agreed to register the website.  The BBC reported Monster as saying that Gab's founder Andrew Torba was "doing something that looks useful", and that Gab's removal from the internet was "digital censorship".  He subsequently became an active user and defender of the network. He has received media attention for publicly defending violent neo-Nazi Gab users, maligning people who criticize the site and call for stricter moderation, and making unevidenced claims that racist users are fake accounts created to hurt the site's reputation.

Monster also previously defended the idea of hosting 8chan, a far-right imageboard known for its hateful content, connections to multiple mass shootings, and hosting of child pornography. Epik briefly hosted 8chan after Cloudflare terminated services for the site, after the perpetrator of the 2019 El Paso shooting allegedly used it to post his justification for the shooting. The following day Epik was banned from their primary hardware provider Voxility because of their services to 8chan, taking 8chan, The Daily Stormer, and other Epik customers offline. Monster wrote the day after the ban from Voxility that he had changed his decision to provide services to the imageboard site, although Ars Technica noted in August 2019 that the company had only stopped providing 8chan with content hosting services, and had taken on providing the site's DNS services.

The Daily Telegraph described Monster in 2021 as "a key figure in the far-right's battle to stay online". Michael Edison Hayden, a researcher with the Southern Poverty Law Center (SPLC), has said that many harmful websites would not be on the internet if it were not for Epik, and that "No one is saying that Rob Monster himself is going out there and making terroristic threats, but if he doesn't want to be associated with this brand, he can certainly step up and say, 'absolutely, I don't want anything to do with this material. But he's not doing that.'" Monster himself has joked that he is the "Lex Luthor of the Internet".

Other companies 
In 2015, Monster became the interim CEO for DigitalTown, a company that provides community-building platforms. He resigned from this position in 2018 in what was described as a planned departure to allow him to focus on Epik.

Monster founded Toki, a company which provides servers to be distributed in Africa and Asia. It's built on Raspberry Pi, an inexpensive single-board computer and runs a Linux-based operating system named TokiOS. The servers are powered either by a wired electrical connection or battery power; they connect to the Internet, but if no connection is available, they allow users to access preloaded digital content including educational resources, books, maps, and religious content. The servers use technology that Toki says could filter content to avoid some sources of information, or bypass local censorship rules. They also run a search engine which they say is "censorship-resistant".

In 2019, Monster founded the company eRise, which will distribute the devices created by Toki. The servers are still in development, but the company plans to begin distributing them in 2022 or 2023.

Joan Donovan, the director of the Technology and Social Change Research Project  at the Shorenstein Center on Media, Politics and Public Policy, has compared the goals of Toki and eRise to the controversial Internet.org project: "We've seen a similar tactic by Facebook, to provide digital access points that can also serve the purpose of delivering favorable content and ensuring that these groups become dependent on your benevolence... It becomes that much harder later on to change the power dynamics when the ideology is in the infrastructure." Mark Harris writing for TechCrunch observed that, "The Toki devices' selectivity, if practical, could raise its own content and censorship concerns; for example, if eRise allowed extreme content similar to that seen on Epik's clients like Gab and Parler, or ignored scientific advice on COVID-19 or other health issues."

Views 
Monster's political beliefs were described by HuffPost in 2018 as "at times... almost indistinguishable from those of the neo-Nazis he's defended on Gab." The Daily Telegraph said in 2021 that "his comments veer between free speech protectionism and implying support for the type of content his clients carry". Monster describes his own views as Christian libertarianism. Monster has said he is not a free speech absolutist, pointing to his and Epik's decisions to deny services to 8chan as an example of his unwillingness to service companies that cross a "bright line", in this case the "possibility of violent radicalization on the platform". Bobby Allyn wrote for NPR in February 2021: "Yet his self-professed boundaries become squishy upon examination", giving an example where Monster "demurred" on questions about Epik's choice to platform Gab, where white supremacist founder of The Daily Stormer Andrew Anglin had 17,000 followers as of the story's publication. William Turton and Joshua Brustein wrote in Bloomberg Businessweek in April 2021 that Monster had "been radicalized during the Trump years, subjecting his staff to florid conspiracy theories in staff meetings and spending more and more of his energy on politically charged work at Epik."

In December 2018, Monster shared on Gab a video created by Canadian white nationalist Faith Goldy, in which she described migrants as bringing "rape epidemics, sharia law, and the spectacle of terror." In January 2019, Monster appeared as a guest on The People's Square, a podcast hosted by pseudonymous white nationalist Eric Striker. The SPLC criticized him for appearing on the show and for comments he made about white supremacist and former Grand Wizard of the Ku Klux Klan David Duke, including "He's actually a pretty clever guy, he's articulate. He knows history. And I don't know the body of his work, but have a feeling that many people grew up with this mindset that you shouldn't listen to anything David Duke says." Monster later told the SPLC in an interview that he did not know who Striker was when he agreed to speak with him, and that he "disagrees with Duke's racist worldview but respects his intelligence". In an interview with NPR in February 2021, Monster suggested that leaders in the white supremacist movement are "shock jocks" and should not be taken seriously. David Kaye, law professor at the University of California, Irvine and an expert in online speech, said of Monster's comment: "He can say they're just 'shock jocks,' but what we actually see is real world harm coming from the platforms. So how much is somebody who is allowing that content to be hosted operating in real good faith?"

Monster has been accused of antisemitism, which he has denied. In a 2018 Gab post he wrote, "Are there a lot of 'Jewish' people who are in a position of power or influence and favor other 'Jewish' people, Ashkenazi, or otherwise? Sure. Do I think God is impressed by that? No, I do not.... God will deal with them and in His time and His way regardless of hoaxes and conspiracies along the way." He also replied to a Gab user who referred to him using the antisemitic slur "rat kike" to say he was "not a 'kike' nor governed by one. :-)", and reassured a person who expressed disapproval that two members of Epik's board were Jewish that "having a Jewish person on Epik's board may be somewhat helping with keeping certain forces at bay." By 2020, both Jewish board members had resigned from Epik over ideological differences. In a 2018 comment on an Epik blog post explaining why the registrar accepted Gab's business, he wrote "I have many Jewish friends, and have been called 'Mensch' many times".

Monster was widely condemned in the wake of the 2019 Christchurch mosque shootings for uploading video of the shootings to Twitter and Gab. He posted on Gab that he had uploaded the file to the InterPlanetary File System (IPFS), and wrote that Epik was working on a tool to make it simpler for people to create IPFS files, describing IPFS as "crazy clever technology" that makes files "effectively uncensorable". The Washington Post later wrote that Monster had "used the moment as a marketing opportunity" to promote Epik's products. Monster also shared the link to the video on Twitter after Twitter announced it would be removing any video of the incident. His tweet was removed by Twitter after several hours. Monster made claims that the video of the Christchurch shooting was not real, and that the shooting had been a hoax. A former Epik staff member alleged that Monster had begun a company staff meeting by asking employees to watch the video of the shootings, saying that it would prove to them that the attack had been faked.

Monster has promoted several other conspiracy theories, including that the 2018 death of an American missionary who had traveled to North Sentinel Island was a "psyop" intended to discourage Christians from doing missionary work. Monster has also suggested that the 2018 Pittsburgh synagogue shooting and other mass casualty events were "false flag" attacks.

Published works

References

External links
 

1960s births
American business executives
American chief executives
American conspiracy theorists
American founders
American people of Dutch descent
American technology executives
Businesspeople from Philadelphia
Businesspeople from Washington (state)
Christians from Pennsylvania
Christians from Washington (state)
Cornell University alumni
Dutch business executives
Dutch chief executives in the technology industry
Dutch Christians
Dutch conspiracy theorists
Far-right politics in the United States
Living people
Market researchers
Procter & Gamble people
Critics of Wikipedia